John Samuel Bonnici (born February 17, 1965) is an American prelate of the Roman Catholic Church who has been serving as an auxiliary bishop for the Archdiocese of New York in New York City since 2022.

Biography

Early life 
John Bonnici was born on February 17, 1965, in New York City.  He is a 1983 graduate of Cathedral Preparatory School and Seminary in Queens, New York. He earned his bachelor degree in biology and philosophy at St. John's University in Brooklyn, New York, in 1987.

Priesthood 
Bonnici was ordained a priest on June 22, 1991, by Cardinal John O'Connor for the Archdiocese of New York. Bonnici served for a number of years in offices in the archdiocese and as a professor at St Joseph's Seminary in Yonkers, New York.  He obtained a Licentiate of Theology from the John Paul II Pontifical Theological Institute for Marriage and Family Sciences in Rome in 1992 and then his doctorate in 1995.

Bonnici served as director of the Family Life-Respect Life Office for the archdiocese and chair of the State Catholic Conference's Human Life Coordinators.

In April 2002, New York Governor George Pataki appointed Bonnici to a six-year term on the board of trustees of the City University of New York. His appointment was criticized for his lack of higher education expertise and his political positions on LGBT rights and abortion rights for women  

Bonnici has had several assignments in New York parishes 

 Pastor of St. Columba in Chester, New York 
 Pastor of St. Philip Neri in Bronx, New York
 Parochial vicar of Our Lady of Mount Carmel in Elmsford, New York
 Pastor of Saints John and Paul in Larchmont, New York
 Pastor of St. Augustine , in Larchmont

Auxiliary Bishop of New York 
On January 25, 2022, Pope Francis appointed Bonnici as an auxiliary bishop for the Archdiocese of New York. Bonnici was consecrated as a bishop by Cardinal Timothy Dolan on March 1, 2022.

See also

 Catholic Church hierarchy
 Catholic Church in the United States
 Historical list of the Catholic bishops of the United States
 List of Catholic bishops of the United States
 Lists of patriarchs, archbishops, and bishops

References

External links
Roman Catholic Archdiocese of New York Official Site

Episcopal succession

 

1965 births
Living people
American Roman Catholic priests
Bishops appointed by Pope Francis